Larry Stoops, better known as "Steamboat Willie" (born 1951), is a veteran musician of Dixieland, jazz, and ragtime music, specializing in the early twentieth century era of the genres. He and his band perform nightly at Musical Legends Park, in the French Quarter of New Orleans, at the Cafe Beignet.

Early life
Born in East St. Louis, Illinois, the son of Resal and Edith [Rutledge] Stoops, Larry Stoops was playing cornet in a Pentecostal church band by the age of 8, and developed a style he refers to as, "playing fancy." While still a teenager, Stoops went to Tupelo, Mississippi, to study at the Pentecostal Bible Institute. He sold Kirby vacuum sweepers and worked at a local grocery for $1 an hour to put himself through school. His first job after graduation was selling Bibles. Married at 20, Stoops was posted as an assistant pastor in Maine, but “I just couldn’t make it. I couldn’t make enough money to feed myself or my wife. One day I got a six-pack of beer, called the pastor, and let them know I quit. (I didn’t even drink.)” Three of Stoops four siblings are members of the clergy.

Career
Stoops' music career got started while he was working at a car-seat manufacturer in St. Louis. He was given a cornet, practiced with it, and eventually was asked to sit in with band playing at a local country club. Wearing his signature panama hat, Stoops has been a publicly performing musician since 1972, mostly in Louisiana, and especially in New Orleans. Stoops picked up his nickname “Steamboat Willie” during a gig in Biloxi, Mississippi. The Steamboat Willie Jazz Ensemble usually consists of a rotating and varying combination of clarinet, trombone, tuba, string, bass, piano and/or drum players; in addition to Stoops leading on trumpet or cornet. He sings most vocals.

In 1997, Stoops appeared with Larry Hagman in an episode of the television series, Orleans, on CBS.

After Hurricane Katrina devastated the city in 2005, Stoops went on a "relief tour" to several university and college towns around the country. In 2006, Stoops became a resident of New Orleans' Musicians' Village, a Habitat for Humanity project for musicians displaced by Katrina, and performed privately for Norway's Crown Prince Haakon when he toured the recovering  area later that year.

Discography
Steamboat Willie Meets Dr. Jazz
Live in New Zealand
Living It Up in New Orleans
Songs Of Praise
Live in New Orleans (Volumes 1 & 2)
New Orleans Kind of Love
Steamboat Willie Meets Plink Floyd (Volumes 1 & 2)
Gospel Jubilee
The Legend of Jack Daniels (2008)

References

External links 
 Steamboat Willie home page
 New Orleans' Cafe Beignet
 ; June 21, 2012 interview.

Jazz musicians from New Orleans
American jazz trumpeters
American male trumpeters
American jazz cornetists
Hurricane Katrina disaster relief fundraising
1950 births
People from East St. Louis, Illinois
Musicians from New Orleans
Living people
21st-century trumpeters
Jazz musicians from Illinois
21st-century American male musicians
American male jazz musicians